Sir Walter Stirling, 1st Baronet (24 June 1758 – 25 August 1832) was an English banker and politician.

He was born in Philadelphia the son of Captain Walter Stirling, RN of Faskine, Lanark and his wife Dorothy Willing of Philadelphia.

He was Captain commandant then Major commandant of the Somerset Place Volunteers in 1798, Lieut-Col. of the Prince of Wales's Loyal Middlesex Volunteers in 1803-08 and a member of the London and Westminster Light Horse in 1803–07.

He was a director of the Globe Insurance Co. and a junior partner in the bank of Hodsoll and Michel (later Hodsoll and Stirling) in the Strand. He was elected MP for Gatton, Surrey from 1799 to 1802 and St Ives, Cornwall from 1807 to 1820. He was created a baronet in 1800 and appointed High Sheriff of Kent for 1804–05.

He was a fellow of the Society of Antiquaries and elected a Fellow of the Royal Society in 1801.

In 1794, he married Susannah, the daughter and heiress of George Trenchard Goodenough, FRS of Borwood, Isle of Wight: they had a son and 4 daughters. Lady Stirling died in 1806, and is buried in St Mary's Church, Harmondsworth.

He died in 1832 and was succeeded in the baronetcy by his son Sir Walter George Stirling, 2nd Baronet.

References 

1758 births
1832 deaths
Politicians from Philadelphia
British bankers
Baronets in the Baronetage of Great Britain
Members of the Parliament of Great Britain for English constituencies
British MPs 1796–1800
Members of the Parliament of the United Kingdom for English constituencies
UK MPs 1801–1802
UK MPs 1807–1812
Fellows of the Royal Society
Fellows of the Society of Antiquaries of London
High Sheriffs of Kent
Members of the Parliament of the United Kingdom for St Ives